The office of Keeper of the Privy Seal of Scotland, one of the Great Officers of State, first appears in the reign of David II.  After the Act of Union 1707 its holder was normally a peer, like the Keeper of the Great Seal. The office has remained unfilled since the death of Gavin, Marquess of Breadalbane in 1922.

Section 3 of the Public Offices (Scotland) Act 1817 limited the salary for the office to a maximum of £1,200 per annum. The salary was paid out of the fees charged for instruments passing the Privy Seal, after the salary of the Deputy Keeper had been paid.

Keepers of the Privy Seal of Scotland

1371: Sir John Lyon
?
1424: Walter Foote, Provost of Bothwell
1426: John Cameron, Provost of Lincluden, Bishop of Glasgow
1432: William Foulis, Provost of Bothwell
1442: William Turnbull, canon of Glasgow
1458: Thomas Spens, Bishop of Galloway
1459: John Arouse
1463: James Lindsay, Provost of Lincluden
1467: Thomas Spens (again), Bishop of Aberdeen
1470: William Tulloch, Bishop of Orkney, later of Moray
1482: Andrew Stewart, Bishop of Moray and half-brother to James III
1483: David Livingston, Provost of Lincluden
1489: John, Prior of St Andrews
1500: William Elphinstone, Bishop of Aberdeen
1507: Alexander Gordon, Bishop of Aberdeen
1514: David, Abbot of Arbroath
1519: George Crichton, Abbot of Holyrood and from 1526 the Bishop of Dunkeld
????: Robert Colvill, of Crawford
1542: David Beaton, Abbot of Arbroath, Cardinal Archbishop of St Andrews
1542: John Hamilton, Abbot of Paisley, later Archbishop of St Andrews
1547: William Ruthven, 2nd Lord Ruthven
1533: Alexander Seton, 1st Lord Fyvie
1563: Sir Richard Maitland, of Lethington
1567: John Maitland, Prior of Coldingham
1571: George Buchanan
1581: John Maitland, Prior of Coldingham
1583: Walter Stewart, commendator of Blantyre
1595: Sir Richard Cockburn of Clerkington
1626: Thomas Hamilton, 1st Earl of Melrose, later 1st Earl of Haddington
1641: Robert Ker, 1st Earl of Roxburghe
1649: John Gordon, 14th Earl of Sutherland (appointed by the Parliament)
1660: William Keith, 7th Earl Marischal
1661: Charles Seton, 2nd Earl of Dunfermline
1672: John Murray, 2nd Earl of Atholl, later 1st Marquess of Atholl
1689: Archibald Douglas, 1st Earl of Forfar
1689: John Keith, 1st Earl of Kintore
1689: John Carmichael, 2nd Lord Carmichael
1690: George Melville, 1st Earl of Melville
1695: James Douglas, 2nd Duke of Queensberry
1702: John Murray, 2nd Marquess of Atholl, later 1st Duke of Atholl
1705: James Douglas, 2nd Duke of Queensberry
1709: James Graham, 1st Duke of Montrose
1713: John Murray, 1st Duke of Atholl
1714: John Ker, 1st Duke of Roxburghe
1715: William Johnston, 1st Marquess of Annandale
1721: Archibald Campbell, 1st Earl of Ilay
1733: James Murray, 2nd Duke of Atholl
1763: The Hon. James Stuart-Mackenzie
1765: Lord Frederick Campbell
1765: John Campbell, 3rd Earl of Breadalbane and Holland
1766: The Hon. James Stuart-Mackenzie
1800: Henry Dundas, later 1st Viscount Melville
1811: Robert Saunders Dundas, 2nd Viscount Melville
1851: vacant
1853: Fox Maule Ramsay, 2nd Baron Panmure, later 11th Earl of Dalhousie
1874: Schomberg Henry Kerr, 9th Marquess of Lothian
1900: Ronald Ruthven Leslie-Melville, 11th Earl of Leven
1907: Gavin Campbell, 1st Marquess of Breadalbane
1922: vacant

Sources
J. Haydn, The Book of Dignities, 1894
François Velde, in thread "Keepers of the Privy Seal of Scotland, 1874–1907", newsgroup alt.talk.royalty, 26 April 2005

See also
Keeper of the seals
Lord Privy Seal

Political history of Scotland
Government occupations
Political office-holders in Scotland
Lists of office-holders in Scotland
Members of the Privy Council of Scotland